Neisseria subflava is a common inhabitant found in the human upper respiratory tract. It is a gram-negative diplococcus. It produces a positive result of blue when put through the oxidase test. It is considered non-pathogenic, although in rare case it can be the causative agent of postoperative meningitis (after a neurological surgery), which is called surgical site infection (SSI).

References

External links
Type strain of Neisseria subflava at BacDive -  the Bacterial Diversity Metadatabase

Neisseriales
Bacteria described in 1889